Milton Yakus (December 25, 1917 – November 6, 1980) was an American songwriter of popular music.  He was married to Martha Yakus, and was the father of recording engineer Shelly Yakus, born in 1945 Milton with his brother Herbert Yakus founded Ace Recording Studios in Boston, Massachusetts.

Notable songs

Yakus wrote or co-wrote the following publications:
"Annie Oakley"
"At the River" 
"Go on with the Wedding" 
"I Love Love Love Love Love" 
"If You Kiss Me" 
"Old Cape Cod"
"Take Me Home" 
"Tell Me"

References

American male songwriters
1917 births
1980 deaths
20th-century male musicians